Irving Russell Bush (7 April 1930 - 8 January 2009) was an American musician, best known for his work as a trumpeter. He played with numerous jazz bands, dance bands, studio, TV, and recording bands and orchestras, and in particular with Nat King Cole.

Bush had been on the music staff at the University of Southern California and California State University, Los Angeles and was a permanent member of the Los Angeles Philharmonic Orchestra from 1962-1982. Later, he functioned as the personnel manager for the same orchestra.  He has authored several books on trumpet like Trumpet Players Blow with Good Vibrations, and has had several compositions recorded and published. In his spare moments, he manufactured trumpet mouthpieces and conducted clinics on trumpet and related subjects. Bush decided it would be appropriate to commemorate the Bicentennial year utilizing his specialty, the trumpet.

Discography 

Trumpet player:
Trumpet and Drum
 Los Angeles Philharmonic, joining the orchestra for the 1962-63 season
 Artistic trumpet technique and study:
 Irving R. Bush Mouthpieces

References 

American trumpeters
1930 births
2009 deaths